Charles Bowring may refer to:

 Charles R. Bowring (1840–1890), Canadian merchant and politician
 Charles J. Bowring (1887–1959), English cricketer
 Charles Tricks Bowring (1808–1885), Canadian businessman
 Charles Calvert Bowring (1872–1945), British colonial administrator
 J. C. Bowring (John Charles Bowring, 1821–1893), Hong Kong businessman